The 2019 PDC Asian Tour series consisted of 12 darts tournaments on the 2019 PDC Pro Tour.

The venues for the first 10 events were announced in December 2018.

Prize money
Each event had a prize fund of $10,000.

This is how the prize money is divided:

January

Event 1 
Event 1 was contested on Saturday 26 January 2019 at KBS Sports World in Seoul, South Korea.

Event 2
Event 2 was contested on Sunday 27 January 2019 at KBS Sports World in Seoul, South Korea.

February

Event 3
Event 3 was contested on Saturday 16 February 2019 at Kobe Sanbo-Hall in Kobe, Japan.

Event 4
Event 4 was contested on Sunday 17 February 2019 at Kobe Sanbo-Hall in Kobe, Japan.

March

Event 5
Event 5 was contested on Saturday 30 March 2023 at Leyte Academic Center in Palo, Philippines.

Event 6
Event 6 was contested on Sunday 31 March 2023 at Leyte Academic Center in Palo, Philippines.

June

Event 7
Event 7 was contested on Saturday 22 June 2019 at G-Club in Taipei, Taiwan.

Event 8
Event 8 was contested on Sunday 23 June 2019 at G-Club in Taipei, Taiwan.

July

Event 9
Event 9 was contested on Saturday 27 July 2019 at the Kowloonbay International Trade & Exhibition Centre, Hong Kong.

Event 10
Event 10 was contested on Sunday 28 July 2019 at the Kowloonbay International Trade & Exhibition Centre, Hong Kong.

August

Event 11
Event 11 was contested on Saturday 31 August 2019 at the AUPE Club in Singapore.

September

Event 12
Event 12 was contested on Sunday 1 September 2019 at the AUPE Club in Singapore.

References

2019 in darts
2019 PDC Pro Tour